Gaidar may refer to:

People
Gaidar (surname), a Russian surname
A spelling variant of an Arabic name (Arabic حيدر ), another form of (حيدرة), see Haydar.
A spelling variant of an Azerbaijani given name Heydər, Гейдар taken from Arabic, now more commonly transliterated as Heydar

Places
Gaidar, Iran, a village in Iran
Gaidar, Gagauzia, a commune and village in Gagauzia, Moldova
Gaidar, a former name of Novoalexandrovka village, Rovensky District, Belgorod Oblast, Russia
Gaidar, a former name of Qaraqol village, Atbasar District, Akmola Region, Kazakhstan

See also
 
 Gaydar (disambiguation)